Aiome is a city in Papua New Guinea. It may also refer to,

Aiome language
Aiome Airport